"Hold On" is a song by American heavy metal band All That Remains. The song was released as the lead single from the band's fifth studio album For We Are Many in September 2010.

Music video
The song's music video was released on the band's official YouTube page on October 8, 2010. The video was directed by Ramon Boutviseth.

Track listing

Charts

Personnel
Philip Labonte – vocals
Oli Herbert – lead guitar
Mike Martin – rhythm guitar
Jeanne Sagan – bass guitar
Jason Costa – drums

References

2010 songs
2010 singles
All That Remains (band) songs
Razor & Tie singles
Songs written by Jason Costa
Songs written by Philip Labonte